Stelios Demetriou (born 4 October 1990) is a Cypriot international footballer who plays as a full back for Niki Volos. He has previously played for Doxa Katokopias, Akritas Chlorakas, Apollon Limassol, Ermis Aradippou, Lokomotiv Plovdiv, St Mirren, Ross County and Macclesfield Town.

Club career

Stelios Demetriou won the first trophy in his career with Ermis Aradippou in the Cypriot Super Cup in 2014 against APOEL, and it was also the club's first trophy in its history. He has also represented Cyprus at under-21 level.

Demetriou signed for Scottish Championship side St Mirren in January 2017. After impressing in his short time at the club, he signed a new one-year deal in June 2017. Demetriou helped St Mirren win the 2017–18 Scottish Championship, but was released at the end of his contract.

On 25 June 2018 Demetriou signed for Scottish Championship side Ross County. He then moved to Macclesfield Town in January 2019. He was released by Macclesfield after only two appearances.

International career
On 20 May 2018 Demetriou made his debut for Cyprus in a 3–0 friendly match defeat by Jordan. Demetriou came on as an 87th minute substitute, and was booked the following minute.

Honours
Ermis Aradippou
Cypriot Super Cup: 2014

St Mirren
Scottish Championship: 2017–18

Ross County
Scottish Championship:
[[2018-19 Scottish
Championship |2018-19]]

References

External links
 

1990 births
Living people
Footballers from Greater London
Cypriot footballers
Cyprus under-21 international footballers
Cyprus international footballers
English footballers
English people of Greek Cypriot descent
Cypriot expatriate footballers
Association football defenders
Akritas Chlorakas players
Apollon Limassol FC players
Ermis Aradippou FC players
PFC Lokomotiv Plovdiv players
Akropolis IF players
Doxa Katokopias FC players
St Mirren F.C. players
Ross County F.C. players
Macclesfield Town F.C. players
Bradford (Park Avenue) A.F.C. players
Nea Salamis Famagusta FC players
Niki Volos F.C. players
Cypriot Fourth Division players
Cypriot Second Division players
Cypriot First Division players
First Professional Football League (Bulgaria) players
Ettan Fotboll players
Scottish Professional Football League players
English Football League players
Super League Greece 2 players
Expatriate footballers in Bulgaria
Expatriate footballers in Sweden
Expatriate footballers in Scotland
Expatriate footballers in England
Expatriate footballers in Greece
Cypriot expatriate sportspeople in Bulgaria
Cypriot expatriate sportspeople in Sweden
Cypriot expatriate sportspeople in Scotland
Cypriot expatriate sportspeople in England
Cypriot expatriate sportspeople in Greece